The 1993 Women's Hockey Junior World Cup was the second edition of the Women's Hockey Junior World Cup, the quadrennial women's under-21 field hockey world championship organized by the International Hockey Federation. It was held at Atlètic Terrassa Hockey Club in Terrassa, Spain from 7 to 18 September 1993.

Argentina won the tournament for the first time by defeating Australia 2–1 in the final. The defending champions Germany won the bronze medal by defeating South Korea 3–2 after penalty strokes.

Preliminary round

Pool A

Pool B

Second round

Ninth to twelfth place classification

Ninth to twelfth place classification

First to fourth place classification

Semi-finals

Third and fourth place

Final

Final standings

See also
1993 Men's Hockey Junior World Cup

References

Women's Hockey Junior World Cup
Junior World Cup
International women's field hockey competitions hosted by Catalonia
Hockey Junior World Cup
Sport in Terrassa
Hockey Junior World Cup
Hockey World Cup